is a professional Japanese baseball player. He plays pitcher for the Chunichi Dragons. He previously played for the Yokohama DeNA BayStars.

External links

 NPB.com

1995 births
Living people
Baseball people from Sapporo
Japanese baseball players
Nippon Professional Baseball pitchers
Chunichi Dragons players
Yokohama DeNA BayStars players